ITA Award for Best Show Popular is an award given by Indian Television Academy as a part of its annual event. The winners are decided by audience voting. First awarded in 2001, it was originally named Desh Ka Dharavahik but was later renamed to Best Show Popular.

Winners

See also

ITA Award for Best Actor Popular
ITA Award for Best Actress Popular
ITA Award for Best Actor Drama
ITA Award for Best Actress Drama
ITA Award for Best Show Drama

References

Indian Television Academy Awards